Good men may refer to:

 The good men, self-designation of followers of the mediaeval Christian movement of Catharism
 Good Men (film), a 2011 American short film
 The Good Men, a stage name for Dutch music duo Chocolate Puma
 The Good Men Project, an American organization

See also